Lloyd Segan is an American film and television producer, and a principal in Piller/Segan, an independent content production company.

Television production 
Segan made his foray into television in 2001 with The Dead Zone based on Stephen King's novel of the same name. Executive produced by Segan and Michael Piller, the series debuted on June 16, 2002, on the USA Network. The series, produced over a 7 year production cycle is now syndicated globally.

Following The Dead Zone, Segan, Michael Piller and Shawn Piller executive-produced Wildfire. This series, which debuted on ABC Family, was the network’s first-ever original scripted series. Wildfire ended after four seasons and audiences petitioned for the show to remain on the air by sending truckloads of hay, 500 cast iron horseshoes, apples, rope, and 1,000 pounds of carrots to ABC Family.

In 2007, Segan and Shawn Piller executive-produced the ABC Family series, Greek. In a review released soon after the premiere of the show, The New York Times claimed that Greek "captures the spirit of the hedge-fund age like nothing else."  Greek ran for a 6-season cable cycle and brought the network a new audience demographic that it had not attracted before.

Segan served as an Executive-Producer on Syfy’s one-hour drama series Haven  which stars Emily Rose (ER). The series was the first to be co-production between NBC Universal Global Networks, Syfy, and Shaw Media. During its first season, Haven, based on the novella The Colorado Kid by Stephen King, was called “A must-see show”  by Entertainment Weekly. "Haven" ran on Syfy for five seasons  year.

Lloyd Segan is currently serving as Executive Producer on Global’s hit series, Private Eyes, which just enjoyed its second season premiere.

Film production 
Segan produced the Scott Lew-penned and Shawn Piller-directed Sexy Evil Genius starring Seth Green, Katee Sackhoff, Michelle Trachtenberg and Harold Perrineau.

Segan’s other feature film credits include 2006's Bickford Shmeckler's Cool Ideas, a college-set comedy starring Patrick Fugit and Olivia Wilde; New Line Cinema's Bones, a hip-hop horror film starring Snoop Dogg; New Line's The Bachelor, starring Chris O’Donnell and Renée Zellweger; the controversial cult hit The Boondock Saints, and its follow-up The Boondock Saints II: All Saints Day, starring Willem Dafoe; Showtime’s Emmy-nominated film, Hendrix, based on the life of Jimi Hendrix; the Eric Schaeffer comedy Wirey Spindell; Universal Studios' thriller Judgment Night, starring Emilio Estevez, Cuba Gooding Jr., Denis Leary and Stephen Dorff; MGM’s action-drama Blown Away with Jeff Bridges and Tommy Lee Jones; and the HBO movie Crossworlds.

Personal life 
Before becoming a producer, Segan was a Programming Executive at NBC, then a Motion Picture and Literary Agent at InterTalent Agency, where he represented leading film directors and writers.

Segan is married to former Disney Executive and critically acclaimed producer Allison Lyon Segan, and together they have two daughters, Emily and Rose. He earned his BA at Allegheny College  and then earned a Masters of Professional Studies at New York University, and a Juris Doctor degree from Whittier College School of Law.

He serves as the president of his synagogue, the Leo Baeck Temple in Los Angeles.

Filmography
He was a producer in all films unless otherwise noted.

Film

Thanks

Television

References

External links

Allegheny College alumni
American television producers
American film producers
Living people
New York University alumni
American Jews
Year of birth missing (living people)